The 2013–14 Lehigh Mountain Hawks men's basketball team represented Lehigh University during the 2013–14 NCAA Division I men's basketball season. The Mountain Hawks, led by seventh year head coach Brett Reed, played their home games at Stabler Arena and were members of the Patriot League. They finished the season 14–18, 7–11 in Patriot League play to finish in sixth place. They lost in the quarterfinals of the Patriot League tournament to Holy Cross.

Roster

Schedule

|-
!colspan=9 style="background:#502D0E; color:#FFFFFF;"| Non-conference regular season

|-
!colspan=9 style="background:#502D0E; color:#FFFFFF;"| Patriot League regular season

|-
!colspan=9 style="background:#502D0E; color:#FFFFFF;"| 2014 Patriot League tournament

References

Lehigh Mountain Hawks men's basketball seasons
Lehigh